Holmes House may refer to:

in the United States
(by state then city)
Holmes-Shannon House, Los Angeles, California, listed on the National Register of Historic Places (NRHP)
Francis H. Holmes House, New Britain, Connecticut, listed on the NRHP in Hartford County
Samuel Holmes House, Highland Park, Illinois, listed on the NRHP in Lake County
Perrigo-Holmes House, Boone, Iowa, listed on the NRHP in Boone County
Sen. John Holmes House, Alfred, Maine, NRHP-listed
Holmes Cottage, Calais, Maine, listed on the NRHP in Washington County
Dr. Job Holmes House, Calais, Maine, listed on the NRHP in Washington County
Holmes-Crafts Homestead, North Jay, Maine, listed on the NRHP in Franklin County
Joseph Holmes House, Cambridge, Massachusetts, NRHP-listed
Oliver Wendell Holmes House, Beverly, Massachusetts, NRHP-listed
Nels A. Holmes Farmstead, Stambaugh, Michigan, listed on the NRHP in Iron County
Holmes House (Magnolia, Mississippi), listed on the NRHP in Pike County
 William Frederick Holmes House, McComb, Mississippi, listed on the NRHP in Pike County
John Holmes House, Cape May Court House, New Jersey, NRHP-listed
Holmes-Hendrickson House, Holmdel, New Jersey, NRHP-listed
Holmes–Tallman House, Monroe Township, New Jersey, listed on the NRHP in Middlesex County
Benjamin Holmes House, Salem, New Jersey, NRHP-listed
Sedberry-Holmes House, Fayetteville, North Carolina, listed on the NRHP in Cumberland County
Gustavus Holmes House, Astoria, Oregon, listed on the NRHP in Clatsop County
William L. Holmes House, Oregon City, Oregon, listed on the NRHP in Clackamas County
Zack Holmes House, Rapid City, South Dakota, listed on the NRHP in Pennington County

See also
 Holmes on Homes (TV series) renovation TV show
 Holmes (disambiguation)